Ahimelech ( ʾĂḥīmeleḵ, "my brother is king"/"brother of a king"), the son of Ahitub and father of Abiathar, but described as the son of Abiathar in  and in four places in 1 Chronicles. He descended from Aaron's son Ithamar and the High Priest of Israel Eli. In  his name is Abimelech according to the Masoretic Text, and is probably the same as Ahiah.

Relation to David 
He was the twelfth High Priest, and officiated at Nob, where he was visited by David (he gave David and his companions five loaves of the showbread) when David fled from Saul. He was summoned into Saul's presence, and accused of disloyalty for assisting David, on the information of Doeg the Edomite. Then the king commanded that he, with the other priests who stood beside him, 86 in all, should be slain with his family. This sentence was carried into execution by Doeg in a cruel manner.

Interpretation
Ahimelech's death was seen as a partial fulfilment of the curse on the House of Eli – that none of Eli's male descendants would live to old age; the other part of the curse on the House of Eli – that the priesthood would pass out of his descendants (1 Samuel 2:)– was fulfilled when Abiathar was deposed from the office of High Priest. Rabbinical literature linked the extermination of the male descendants of David with the extermination of the priests of Nob by Saul - deeming it divine retribution because David's action had provoked Saul's outburst - and also linked the survival of David's descendant Joash with that of Ahimelech's son Abiathar.

See also
Levite
List of High Priests of Israel

References

External link

11th-century BCE High Priests of Israel
11th-century BC deaths
Year of birth unknown
2nd-millennium BC executions
Family of Eli (biblical figure)